Cona, also Cuona Lake or Tsonag Lake, is a major lake of northern Tibet Autonomous Region, China and is  It is located in Amdo County, west of the road between Nagqu Town and Amdo Town. The lake is considered holy to the Tibetans especially in the Bon religion, as it is seen as the "soul lake" of the Razheng Living Buddha. The smaller Ganong Lake lies almost adjacent to the southeast.

The lake is the source of the Gyalmo Nagqu, the headwater of the Salween River.

Tsonag Lake can be observed on the right (west) as the train passes Tsonag Lake Railway Station on Qingzang Railway, going south toward Lhasa.

See also
 Qingzang Railway
 Tsonag Lake Railway Station

References

Lakes of Tibet
Amdo County
Sacred lakes